Khasheh Heyran (also Romanized as Khasheh Ḩeyrān; also known as Khashīrān) is a village in Vilkij-e Shomali Rural District, in the Central District of Namin County, Ardabil Province, Iran. At the 2006 census, its population was 152, in 35 families.

References 

Towns and villages in Namin County